Ardsley Athletic F.C. was an English association football club based in Ardsley, Barnsley, South Yorkshire.

History
The club was formed after the end of the First World War and entered local leagues in the Barnsley and South Yorkshire area. They first entered the FA Cup in 1920, eventually participating in the competition on twelve occasions. In 1928 they lost to Frickley Colliery in the final of the prestigious Sheffield Senior Cup, but a year later they went one better and beat Ecclesfield to lift the trophy.

Notable former players
Players that played in the Football League before or after playing for Ardsley Athletic –

 George Briggs
 Arnold Bonell
 Joe Cockroft
 Steve Griffiths
 Arthur Roberts

Honours
Sheffield Senior Cup – 1928–29

Records
Best FA Cup performance: 4th Qualifying Round, 1928–29

References

Defunct football clubs in South Yorkshire
Sheffield Association League
Barnsley Association League